Dvoyezyory is a rural locality (a village) in Ilkinskoye Rural Settlement, Melenkovsky District, Vladimir Oblast, Russia. The population was 30 as of 2010.

Geography 
Dvoyezyory is located 25 km southwest of Melenki (the district's administrative centre) by road. Ramen is the nearest rural locality.

References 

Rural localities in Melenkovsky District